The 88th Street station (signed as 88th Street–Boyd Avenue station) is a station on the IND Fulton Street Line of the New York City Subway. Located on Liberty Avenue at 88th Street in Ozone Park, Queens, it is served by the A train at all times.

History 
88th Street was one of the six stations along Liberty Avenue in Queens, from 80th Street through Ozone Park–Lefferts Boulevard, as well as the current three track elevated structure, built for the BMT Fulton Street Line in 1915 as part of BMT's portion of the Dual Contracts. The connection to the BMT was severed on April 26, 1956, and the IND was extended east (railroad south) from Euclid Avenue via a connecting tunnel and new intermediate station at Grant Avenue, with the new service beginning on April 29, 1956.

The station was completely renovated in 2014.

Station layout

This elevated station, opened on September 25, 1915, has two side platforms and three tracks with the center track not used in revenue service. Both platforms have beige windscreens for their length and brown canopies with green frames and support columns except for a small section at either ends. Station signs display Boyd Avenue, which was the original name of this station.

The 2015 artwork at this station, MORPHING88, was designed by Haresh Lalvani.

Exits
This station's only entrance/exit is an elevated station house below the platforms at the east (railroad south) end. Inside fare control, there is one staircase to each platform, a waiting area that allows a free transfer between directions, and a turnstile bank. Outside fare control, there is a token booth and two street stairs going down to either eastern corners of 88th Street and Liberty Avenue.

This station formerly had another entrance/exit at the west (railroad north) end that went down to 86th Street. Each platform still has a closed-off staircase to the station house beneath the tracks.

References

External links 

 
 Station Reporter — A Lefferts
 Station Reporter — A Rockaway
 The Subway Nut — 88th Street – Boyd Avenue Pictures 
 88th Street entrance from Google Maps Street View
 Platforms from Google Maps Street View

IND Fulton Street Line stations
BMT Fulton Street Line stations
New York City Subway stations in Queens, New York
Railway stations in the United States opened in 1915
1917 establishments in New York City
1915 establishments in New York City
Ozone Park, Queens